Queenstown MRT station is an above-ground Mass Rapid Transit (MRT) station on the East–West line in Queenstown, Singapore. It is built on a traffic island along Commonwealth Avenue. The station is named after Queen Elizabeth II to mark her coronation in 1952.

History

The station was opened on 12 March 1988, as part of the extension of the MRT system from Outram Park to Clementi. Half-height platform screen doors were installed in January 2011 and started operations on 28 April 2011 together with Commonwealth.

The station was expanded starting mid-2012 and was opened on 23 August 2015 with a new overhead bridge and two new exits, the same day as Commonwealth MRT station.

Incidents
On 29 November 2010, a Chinese man in his 40s was knocked by an incoming train at about 8.15 pm, was found lying on the tracks below the last carriage and was pronounced dead by SCDF medics. Train services were disrupted for about 1 hour and were resumed at 9.15 pm.

See also
 Queenstown, Singapore

References

External links

 

Railway stations in Singapore opened in 1988
Queenstown, Singapore
Mass Rapid Transit (Singapore) stations